The Corbara Dam is located on the River Tiber near Corbara in the province of Terni in the Umbria region of Italy. It is a combination gravity and embankment dam. The gravity section forms the spillway while the embankment section adjoins on the left side. The dam was constructed between 1959 and 1963 for the primary purpose of hydroelectric power generation but it was later found to useful in preventing floods in Rome downstream. The reservoir created by the dam, Lake Corbara, supplies water to the expansive Terni Hydroelectric Complex. The complex has an installed capacity of 531 MW and is owned by Enel.

References

Dams in Italy
Hydroelectric power stations in Italy
Dams completed in 1963
Buildings and structures in the Province of Terni